(2019)
Aïn Touila is a district in Khenchela Province, Algeria. It was named after its capital, Aïn Touila.

Municipalities
The district is further divided into 2 municipalities:
Aïn Touila
M'Toussa

Districts of Khenchela Province

Khenchela District is a district of Khenchela Province, Algeria.